3rd Ward Stepper is the third album released by rapper, Skull Duggery. It was released on June 6, 2000, through independent label Crash Records and featured production from his former No Limit Records' labelmates, KLC and Fiend.

Track listing

References

2000 albums
Skull Duggery (rapper) albums